Carl Lindbom (born 10 November 1991) is a Finnish professional basketball player. He played with the Finland national basketball team at the 2017 EuroBasket.

Lindbom signed with Stal Ostrów Wielkopolski on October 24, 2020, replacing Victor Rudd. In February 2021, he joined Antibes Sharks  of the LNB Pro B. Lindbom averaged 6.4 points and 3.3 rebounds per game.

On October 7, 2021, he signed with Trefl Sopot of the Polish Basketball League.

On January 14, 2022, Lindbom signed with KR of the Icelandic Úrvalsdeild karla.

References

External links
Profile at eurobasket.com
Profile at PLK
Profile at realgm.com

1991 births
Living people
BC Juventus players
Bisons Loimaa players
Finnish expatriate basketball people in Croatia
Finnish expatriate basketball people in Poland
Finnish expatriate basketball people in France
Finnish expatriate basketball people in Germany
Finnish expatriate basketball people in Lithuania
Finnish men's basketball players
Helsinki Seagulls players
KK Vrijednosnice Osijek players
Olympique Antibes basketball players
Power forwards (basketball)
Rosa Radom players
Skyliners Frankfurt players
Small forwards
Sportspeople from Espoo
Stal Ostrów Wielkopolski players
Torpan Pojat players
KR men's basketball players
Úrvalsdeild karla (basketball) players
Finnish expatriate basketball people in Iceland